The 1923–24 season was the 15th in the history of the Isthmian League, an English football competition.

At the end of the previous season West Norwood resigned from the league. St Albans City joined the competition from Athenian League and became champions in their inaugural season.

League table

References

Isthmian League seasons
I